Tabernacle Baptist Academy was a private school in West Memphis, Arkansas.

History
Tabernacle was founded in 1970 as a segregation academy. Travis Case, the pastor of Tabernacle Baptist Church, said, "... if any blacks show up at Tabernacle Baptist Academy, they will be turned away. It has nothing to do with race. We are not anti-Negro."

Tabernacle lost its tax-exempt status in 1970.

Campus
The church, which had operated preschools and kindergartens before, built first a  building for the school.

References

Private high schools in Arkansas
Preparatory schools in Arkansas
Segregation academies in Arkansas
Educational institutions established in 1970
1970 establishments in Arkansas
Defunct schools in Arkansas